Achondrogenesis, type 1B is a severe autosomal recessive skeletal disorder, invariably fatal in the perinatal period. It is characterized by extremely short limbs, a narrow chest and a prominent, rounded abdomen. The fingers and toes are short and the feet may be rotated inward. Affected infants frequently have a soft out-pouching around the belly-button (an umbilical hernia) or near the groin (an inguinal hernia).

Achondrogenesis, type 1B is a rare genetic disorder; its incidence is unknown. Achondrogenesis, type 1B is the most severe condition in a spectrum of skeletal disorders caused by mutations in the SLC26A2 gene. This gene provides instructions for making a protein that is essential for the normal development of cartilage and for its conversion to bone. Mutations in the SLC26A2 gene disrupt the structure of developing cartilage, preventing bones from forming properly and resulting in the skeletal problems characteristic of achondrogenesis, type 1B.

Achondrogenesis, type 1B is inherited in an autosomal recessive pattern, which means two copies of the gene in each cell are altered. Most often, the parents of an individual with an autosomal recessive disorder are carriers of one copy of the altered gene but do not show signs and symptoms of the disorder.

See also
 Diastrophic dysplasia
 Achondrogenesis type 1A

References

This article incorporates public domain text from The U.S. National Library of Medicine

External links
  GeneReviews/NCBI/NIH/UW entry on Achondrogenesis Type 1B

Congenital disorders
Collagen disease